The canton of Fismes-Montagne de Reims is an administrative division of the Marne department, northeastern France. It was created at the French canton reorganisation which came into effect in March 2015. Its seat is in Fismes.

It consists of the following communes:
 
Arcis-le-Ponsart
Aubilly
Baslieux-lès-Fismes
Bouilly
Bouleuse
Bouvancourt
Branscourt
Breuil-sur-Vesle
Châlons-sur-Vesle
Chamery
Chenay
Coulommes-la-Montagne
Courcelles-Sapicourt
Courlandon
Courmas
Courtagnon
Courville
Crugny
Écueil
Faverolles-et-Coëmy
Fismes
Germigny
Gueux
Hourges
Janvry
Jonchery-sur-Vesle
Jouy-lès-Reims
Magneux
Méry-Prémecy
Les Mesneux
Montigny-sur-Vesle
Mont-sur-Courville
Muizon
Ormes
Pargny-lès-Reims
Pévy
Prouilly
Romain
Rosnay
Sacy
Saint-Euphraise-et-Clairizet
Saint-Gilles
Savigny-sur-Ardres
Sermiers
Serzy-et-Prin
Thillois
Treslon
Trigny
Unchair
Vandeuil
Ventelay
Ville-Dommange
Vrigny

References

Cantons of Marne (department)